The Thanet Loop is a circular bus route which operates on the Isle of Thanet peninsula in Kent, England. It is operated by Stagecoach South East.

History 
The route was introduced in 2004 following a grant of £447,000 from the Department for Transport and had an initial fleet of 18 buses. In 2013, 27 Alexander Dennis Enviro200 buses were purchased for the route. In 2018, the route carried over four million passengers. In 2019, a new fleet of 24 buses was introduced.

Route 
The service has a circular  route which passes through Ramsgate, Margate, and Broadstairs. It also calls at Queen Elizabeth The Queen Mother Hospital and Westwood Cross. Buses operate at a maximum frequency of every 8 minutes Monday-Saturday, and every 10 minutes on Sundays.

References 

Bus routes in England
Stagecoach Group
Transport in Kent
Circular bus routes